Poznań is a city in west-central Poland.

Poznań or Poznan may also refer to:

 Poznań, Lublin Voivodeship, a village in eastern Poland
 Poznan, another name for Pozan, an extinct breed of horse found in Poland
 ORP Poznań, a minelayer-landing ship of Polish Navy
 The Poznań, a football supporters' celebration
 Poznań Fortress, a fortress in Poznań

See also 
 Poznań County, an administrative district surrounding Poznań
 Poznań Voivodeship, a name given to various former administrative regions
 Posen (disambiguation)